C More Sport is a Scandinavian pay television sports network owned by C More Entertainment. It was launched as the Nordic version of Canal+ Sport on 1 May 2004, when C More introduced themed channels for movies and sports. On 1 September 2005, most sports broadcasts were moved to Canal+ Sport and separate versions of the channel were made for Sweden, Denmark, Norway and Finland. With the launch of a second sports channel, the first channels got their current name.  Canal+ Sport 1 in Denmark was rebranded as Canal 8 Sport on 13 August 2012.

Programming

Football
La Liga
Serie A
CONCACAF Gold Cup
Major League Soccer (Sweden only)
Argentine Primera División
UEFA Europa League (Finland only)
UEFA Nations League (Sweden only)
Barça TV
Real Madrid TV
Arsenal TV
Chelsea TV
Tennis
ATP Tour 
Various tournaments on the WTA Tour
Ice hockey
Elitserien/Swedish Hockey League (SHL) 
IIHF Ice Hockey World Championships
Basketball
National Basketball Association (NBA)
Mixed martial arts
Ultimate Fighting Championship (UFC)
World Extreme Cagefighting (WEC)
Motorsports
IndyCar
Elitserien
Scandinavian Touring Car Championship (STCC)

Past Sports rights
Football
Premier League
Allsvenskan
Eredivisie
Bundesliga
Copa del Rey
Primeira Liga
Royal League
Tippeligaen
The Championship
League Cup
Copa América
Ice hockey
National Hockey League (NHL)
Mixed martial arts
PRIDE Fighting Championship
Motorsports
Formula 3
DTM
BTCC
ESPN America programming
Golf Channel programming

See also 
 C More Entertainment
 C More First
 C More Hits
 C More Action
 C More Tennis

References

External links

Television channels in Sweden
Television channels in Norway
Pan-Nordic television channels
Sports television networks
Television channels and stations established in 2004